Alliance Airlines Pty Limited is an Australian airline based in Brisbane, Queensland, with operational bases in Adelaide, Cairns, Melbourne, Perth, Townsville, Darwin, and Rockhampton. Alliance Airlines owns and operates a fleet of Fokker and Embraer jet aircraft:  Fokker 70, Fokker 100 and Embraer 190. Alliance runs fly-in fly-out (FIFO) air charter services for the Australian mining and resources industry, as well as private aircraft charters throughout Australia, New Zealand, the Pacific Islands and South East Asia. Alliance also provides aircraft component sales and leasing worldwide.

History
Alliance Airlines was established in 2002 when Brisbane based Queensland Airline Holdings acquired the AOC (Airline Operator Certificate) and assets of the dormant Flight West Airlines, which had been established in May 1987 and ceased scheduled services in 2001. Alliance commenced operations with two Fokker 100 aircraft and has since expanded its fleet and operational capabilities to service the growing demand from the mining and energy sector. It is a subsidiary of Alliance Aviation Services that was listed on the Australian Securities Exchange in 2011 and now has over 590 employees. 

Alliance was recognised as the first aircraft operator in Australia to attain Flight Safety Foundation Basic Aviation Risk Standard (BARS) Gold Status in 2013

In November 2015, Alliance announced the purchase of 6 Fokker 70 and 15 Fokker 100 aircraft from Austrian Airlines. In 2016, the airline was recognised as the first regional aircraft operator in Australia to attain IATA Operational Safety Audit (IOSA) certification. In November 2018, Alliance was awarded CAPA Asia Pacific Regional Airline of the Year.

In February 2019, Qantas acquired a 19.9% shareholding.

In August 2020, Alliance announced a deal to purchase 14 Embraer E190 jets adding to their current fleet and then in December 2020 ordered a further 16 more Embraer E190 jets bringing their total to 30. The first E190, named Brazilian Lad was received by the airline on 29 October 2020 at Brisbane Airport and is expected to enter service in February 2021.

In May 2022, Alliance announced it had agreed terms to be taken over by Qantas. The deal is subject to regulatory and shareholder approval.

Services

Scheduled services

As of Feb 2023, Alliance operates the following routes under its own name:
Adelaide and Olympic Dam
Adelaide and Moomba
Adelaide and Baller via Moomba
Brisbane and Ballera
Brisbane and Cloncurry
Brisbane and Emerald
Brisbane and The Granites
Brisbane and Groote Eylandt
Brisbane and Moranbah
Brisbane and Port Hedland
Brisbane and Rockhampton
Brisbane and Roma
Brisbane and Sunshine Coast
Brisbane and Trepell
Brisbane and Weipa
Cairns and Cloncurry
Cairns and Groote Eylandt
Cairns and Trepell
Perth and Barimunya
Perth and Busselton
Perth and Coondewanna
Perth and The Granites
Perth and Kalgoorlie
Perth and Laverton
Perth and Leinster
Perth and Leonora
Perth and Mount Keith
Perth and Newman
Perth and Onslow
Perth and Port Hedland (operated for BHP with seats made available to the public)
Perth and Telfer
Sunshine Coast and Emerald
Townsville and Cairns
Townsville and Cloncurry
Townsville and Phosphate Hill
Townsville and Trepell

Wet lease
Eight Embraer 190s will be wet leased to Qantas from mid 2021 under a 3 year deal to operate the following routes under the QantasLink brand:
Adelaide and Alice Springs
Adelaide and Cairns
Adelaide and Canberra
Adelaide and Darwin
Adelaide and Gold Coast
Adelaide and Hobart
Adelaide and Townsville
Alice Springs and Darwin
Canberra and Darwin
Melbourne and Townsville
Sydney and Townsville

Alliance previously operated wet lease services to Virgin Australia.

Fly-in fly-out
Alliance Airlines operates fly-in fly-out air services (FIFO) to over 20 mine sites and services mining projects in Australia including Ballera, Cannington, Cloncurry, Cape Preston, Groote Eylandt, Leinster, Mount Keith, Olympic Dam, Phosphate Hill, Telfer, Barimunya, Coondewanna, Newman, Leonora, Century Mine and The Granites.

Aircraft charters
Alliance Airlines provides aircraft charters throughout Australia, New Zealand, the Pacific Islands and South East Asia

Fleet

Current fleet
As of February 2023, the Alliance Airlines fleet consists of the following aircraft:

Former fleet
Alliance Airlines has also previously operated the following aircraft types:
 Boeing 737-400 - 2 aircraft (2012-2013, wet leased from Airwork)
 Embraer EMB 120 Brasilia - 3 aircraft (2002-2003, inherited from Flight West Airlines, sold to Skippers Aviation)
 Fokker 50 - 8 aircraft (2007-2022)

See also
List of airlines of Australia

References

External links

Official website

Aircraft leasing companies
Airlines established in 2002
Australian companies established in 2002
Companies listed on the Australian Securities Exchange
Regional Aviation Association of Australia
Qantas
Charter airlines of Australia
Companies based in Brisbane
Transport in Queensland